District 25 of the Oregon State Senate comprises parts of Multnomah County, including most of Portland's eastern suburbs. It is currently represented by Democrat Laurie Monnes Anderson of Gresham.

Election results
District boundaries have changed over time, therefore, senators before 2013 may not represent the same constituency as today. From 1993 until 2003, the district covered parts of Southern Oregon, and from 2003 until 2013 it covered a slightly different area in the Portland metropolitan area.

References

25
Multnomah County, Oregon